Georg Haas may refer to:
 Georg Haas (paleontologist) (1905–1981), Austrian-born Israeli herpetologist and paleontologist
 Georg Haas (physician) (1886–1971), German physician
 Georg Friedrich Haas (born 1953), Austrian composer 
 Georg Haas (engraver) (1756–1817), Danish engraver